Muhammed Rashid  (born November 1, 1993) is an Indian football midfielder who plays for Gokulam Kerala FC in I-League.

Career statistics

Honours
Gokulam Kerala

Durand Cup: 2019
I-League: 2020–21

References

External links
 

1993 births
Living people
People from Wayanad district
Indian footballers
Footballers from Kerala
Association football midfielders
Gokulam Kerala FC players
I-League players